Winston McGarland Bailey OBE, HBM, DLitt (4 October 1941 – 23 October 2018), better known by his stage name The Mighty Shadow or Shadow, was a calypsonian from Tobago.

Career
Bailey was born in Belmont, a suburb of Port of Spain in Trinidad, but grew up in Les Coteaux, Tobago, with his grandparents. He started singing calypsos at the age of 8.

At the age of 16 he moved back to Port of Spain, where for a time he was homeless while trying to established himself. In 1970 he performed as part of the chorus in Mighty Sparrow's 'Young Brigade' calypso tent, and by the following year he had begun to establish himself as a calypsonian in his own right. He chose the stage name "Shadow" (he didn't use "Mighty" himself) after coming across some workmen digging a road while he was walking. One of the workmen was in a hole below the road surface and the others were calling him "Shadow", and Bailey said: "I felt like they was calling me". In his early years he performed wearing all black, with a large hat covering part of his face.

The Guardian newspaper, speaking of Shadow's stagecraft, argued that he had "a persona and outlook that stood in dramatic contrast to the classic bravura of the typical calypsonian, one that might have been expected to generate either bemusement or scorn in his native Trinidad and Tobago", and yet noted that on the contrary his stage presence and music "proved so original, so eerily amusing and so engaging that [he] quickly came to be hailed as one of the greats".

He won the Road March in 1974 with "Bassman" (where he also placed second with "I Come Out to Play") by a record margin, and won again in 2001 with "Stranger", making him the competition's oldest winner. He won the Calypso Monarch contest in 2000 with "What's Wrong With Me" and "Scratch Meh Back". His music used bass more prominently than most calypsonians, of which he said "I did 'Bassman', then I started to use melodic bass lines, not like they used before, and when I performed in the calypso tents in the early days, I had one extra sheet of music, just for the bass."  Shadow' innovative use of the melodic bassline in "Bassman" was a harbinger of things to come with the emerging soca music style that would transform calypso in the mid-1970s. Shadow is also known for his unique dance in which he jumped to the tempo of his music in "skip-rope style" with both feet in the air at the same time.  

He was the second calypsonian to win both the International Soca Monarch and the Trinidad Road March competitions simultaneously, a feat he accomplished in 2001 with "Stranger". He rivalled fellow calypsonians Mighty Sparrow and Lord Kitchener after winning the Road March in 1974.

Shadow is the subject of Christopher Laird's 2017 film King from Hell, featuring concert performances and an interview.

He died on 23 October 2018 at the age of 77 at Mount Hope Hospital in St. Joseph, after suffering a stroke two days earlier.

Awards and recognition

 1988 -  NAFEITA Award
 1991 -  N.A.C.C. - Top 20 Stars of Gold Calypso Award - "If the Poor Get Rich"
 1993 -  3rd Annual Caribbean Music Awards - Best Engineered Recording 
 1994 -  N.A.C.C. Calypso of the Year Award - "Poverty is Hell" 
 1995 -  5th Annual Caribbean Music Awards - Best Record, Calypso/Social Commentary 
 1995 -  Sunshine Awards - Best Social Commentary
 1995 -  Everybody's, The Caribbean Magazine - Calypso Awards - Most Humorous Calypso 
 1996 -  Eastern Credit Union - Outstanding Contribution to the Calypso Artform 
 1996 -  N.A.C.C. - Top 20 Stars of Gold Calypso Award - "For Better of Worse"
 1997 -  N.A.C.C. - Top 20 Stars of Gold Calypso Award - "Treat Your Lady Nice"
 2000 -  N.A.C.C. - Top 20 Stars of Gold Calypso of the Year Award - "Scratch Meh Back"
 2000 -  Trinidad and Tobago Association of Baltimore - Achievement Award for Lifetime Contribution 
 2000 -  Mucurapo Senior Comprehensive - Recognition of Contribution to the Culture 
 2000 -  Calypso Classics - Outstanding Contribution to the Artform 
 2000 -  Top Fifty Calypsonians of the Twentieth Century 
 2001 -  N.A.C.C. - Top 20 Stars of Gold Calypso Award - "Looking for Horn"
 2001 -  COTT - Song of the Year
 2001 -  Vibe CT 105/TUCO Kitchener - National Road March Winner
 2001 -  TUCO/Honda Calypso Monarch - 2nd Place 
 2001 -  Vistrac Ltd - Outstanding Performance 
 2001 -  UNAIDS - Spokesperson for the Caribbean in worldwide fight against HIV/AIDS 
 2001 -  Power 102 - In Recognition of Carnival 2001 Soca Monarch and Road March 
 2002 -  Sunshine Awards - Calypso of the Year "Looking for Horn"
 2002 -  Sunshine Awards - Producer of the Year - "Stranger"
 2002 -  COTT - Golden Achievement Award
 2002 -  The Port of Spain Corporation Award of Appreciation 
 2002 -  N.A.C.C. - Top 20 Stars of Gold Calypso Award - "Goumangala"
 2002 -  Spektakula Promotions - Appreciation for Contribution to the Culture 
 2003 -  N.A.C.C. - Top 20 Stars of Gold Calypso Award - "Find Peace"
 2004 -  Hilton Trinidad - Recognition for Contribution to the Culture 
 2004 - N.A.C.C. - Top 20 Stars of Gold Calypso Award - "Cocoyea"
 2004 -  TUCO - Chantuelle Excellence Award 
 2006 -  Bmobile Award for Recognition of Contribution to Culture 
 2007 -  N.A.C.C. - Top 20 Stars of Gold Calypso Award - For Excellence and Outstanding Achievement in Music
 2007 -  TUCO - Humorous Commentary 1st Place - "If Ah Coulda"
 2008 -  Crosstowm Carnival Committee - Dragon Nest Award of Merit 
 2009 -  Signal Hill Alumni Choir - Music That Matters
 2010 -  TUCO Outstanding Contribution to the Calypso Artform
 2014 -  Sunshine Awards - Hall of Fame

Honours

In 2003, Bailey received the Hummingbird Medal (Silver) for his contributions to music in Trinidad and Tobago.

On 27 October 2018, the University of the West Indies conferred on Bailey the Degree of Doctor of Letters (DLitt) Honoris Causa for his contributions as a musical composer, an award he had been due to receive before he died.

Discography

Albums
 1974 - De Bassman
 1979 - Love Lite
 1979 - If I Coulda I Woulda I Shoulda
 1980 - Shadow
 1984 - Sweet Sweet Dreams
 1984 - Return of De Bassman
 1987 - Raw Energy
 1988 - Dingolay
 1988 - High Tension
 1990 - The Monster
 1991 - Columbus Lied
 1992 - Winston Bailey is the Shadow
 1999 - Am I Sweet or What?
 2000 - Once Upon a Time
 2003 - No Middle Ground
 2003 - Fully Loaded

Singles

References

Other sources

Further reading

External links
 Shadow discography at Discogs 
 "SHADOW, Mighty", Donald's Encyclopedia of Popular Music.
 Mighty Shadow obituary, The Guardian

1941 births
2018 deaths
20th-century Trinidad and Tobago male singers
20th-century Trinidad and Tobago singers
Calypsonians
People from Tobago
Soca musicians
Recipients of the Hummingbird Medal
21st-century Trinidad and Tobago male singers
21st-century Trinidad and Tobago singers